Kakpin is a town in north-eastern Ivory Coast. It is a sub-prefecture of Nassian Department in Bounkani Region, Zanzan District.

Kakpin was a commune until March 2012, when it became one of 1126 communes nationwide that were abolished.

In 2014, the population of the sub-prefecture of Kakpin was 7,040.

Villages
The six villages of the sub-prefecture of Kakpin and their population in 2014 are:
 Banvayo (1 599)
 Gansé (1 940)
 Kakpin (891)
 Kapé (643)
 Solokaye (293)
 Zamou (1 674)

Notes

Sub-prefectures of Bounkani
Former communes of Ivory Coast